The great cuckoo-dove (Reinwardtoena reinwardti) is a species of bird in the family Columbidae.
It is found in the Maluku Islands and New Guinea.

The cuckoo-dove makes its nest in rock gorges near waterfalls, and their calls are the two-part wok-wu, heard above the sounds of the water. In motion the bird bounces up and down in place, stable on the first syllable (wok), bouncing up on the higher outward syllable (wu). This is reflected in the dance of the Kaluli drummers of Papua New Guinea.

References

great cuckoo-dove
Birds of the Maluku Islands
Birds of New Guinea
great cuckoo-dove
Taxonomy articles created by Polbot